Inguinal fossa may refer to:

 Lateral inguinal fossa
 Medial inguinal fossa